Rugby league in the Czech Republic was started in 2006. The Czechs received government funding before a game was played there, and in their first game on August 5, 2006 in Prague, the Czechs went down 34-28 to the Netherlands.

In 2007 the Czech Republic took part in the European Shield tournament. This included two other 2nd tier nations; Germany and Serbia. Czech national team lost the both matches, v Germany 22-44 in Prague (4 August) and v Serbia 16-56 in Belgrade (18 August), and finished third.

In 2011, the Czech Rugby League Association was admitted to affiliate membership of the Rugby League European Federation after reforming its governance.

See also

Czech Rugby League Association
Czech Republic national rugby league team

References

External links